San Francisco Dues is the fifteenth studio album by Chuck Berry, released in 1971 by Chess Records.

Overview
It was Chuck Berry's second Chess release after returning to the label in 1969. The album contains seven new songs, a poem and two songs ("Lonely School Days" and "Viva Rock and Roll") from his previous Chess recordings.

Track listing
All songs written by Chuck Berry

"Oh Louisiana" – 4:28
"Let's Do Our Thing Together" – 2:20
"Your Lick" – 2:34
"Festival" – 4:08
"Bound to Lose" – 3:06
"Bordeaux in My Pirough" – 2:35
"San Francisco Dues" – 3:23
"Viva Rock and Roll" – 2:02
"My Dream" (Poem) – 6:00
"Lonely School Days" – 2:36

Personnel

Musicians
 Chuck Berry –  guitar, piano on "My Dream" (Poem), vocals
 Jeff Baldori –  second guitar
 Bob Baldori –  electric piano,  harmonica
 Jack "Zocko" Groendal –  bass guitar
 Johnnie Johnson –  piano
 Bill Metros –  drums
 Maurice White - drums

Technical
 Esmond Edwards –  supervisor
 Dean Bredwell –  engineer
 Michael Mendel –  cover,  design

References

External links

Chuck Berry albums
1971 albums
Albums produced by Chuck Berry
Chess Records albums